Eric Christopher Roof (born November 15, 1986) is an American college baseball coach and former catcher. He is the head baseball coach at Eastern Michigan University. Roof played college baseball at St. Catharine College and at Michigan State University for coaches David Grewe and Jake Boss from 2007 to 2009.

Amateur career
Roof attended St. Mary High School in Paducah, Kentucky. Roof then enrolled at St. Catharine College, to play college baseball for the Patriots baseball team.

As a freshman at St. Catharine College in 2006, Roof had a .345 batting average, 4 home runs and a 33 RBIs.

As a sophomore in 2007, Roof transferred to Michigan State University to play for the Michigan State Spartans baseball team. He batted .247 with a .333 SLG, 1 home run, and 9 RBIs.

In the 2008 season as a junior, Roof hit .308 with a .423 SLG, 3 home runs, and 33 RBIs. Roof was drafted in the 46th round of the 2008 Major League Baseball draft by the Detroit Tigers, but Roof opted to return to Michigan State for his senior season.

Roof had his best season as a senior in 2009, hitting a career high in doubles (14), home runs (6), RBIs (41) and slugged (.525).

Professional career
Roof was drafted by the Tigers again, this time in the 18th round of the 2009 Major League Baseball draft. Roof played 3 years in the Tigers's organization. Playing for the Oneonta Tigers, West Michigan Whitecaps, Connecticut Tigers and Lakeland Flying Tigers.

Coaching career
Roof returned to Michigan State as a volunteer assistant in 2013 and remained with the program through 2014.
In late December 2017, Van Ameyde left Eastern Michigan to become the pitching coach at Michigan State. On January 3, 2018, Roof was named the interim head coach for the Eagles.

On June 4, 2018, Roof was named the full-time head coach of the Eastern Michigan program.

Head coaching record

See also
 List of current NCAA Division I baseball coaches

References

External links

Eastern Michigan Eagles bio

Living people
1986 births
Baseball first basemen
Baseball catchers
Junior college baseball players in the United States
Michigan State Spartans baseball players
Oneonta Tigers players
West Michigan Whitecaps players
Connecticut Tigers players
Lakeland Flying Tigers players
Michigan State Spartans baseball coaches
Baseball coaches from Kentucky
Baseball players from Kentucky
Sportspeople from Paducah, Kentucky